"Hello Sun" is a song by the Hungarian indie rock band Amber Smith. It is the second track and lead single from the band's third album, RePRINT (2005), released on Kalinkaland Records. Written by Imre Poniklo, the song uses a verse-chorus form.

Track listings

7": Kalinkaland 
"Hello Sun" – 3:12
"Sea Eyes" (remix) – 4:22
"Pete and Julie" - 3:12
"RePRINT" - 4:23

Credits and personnel

Credits for Hello Sun adapted from Discogs.
Performance
Oszkár Ács - bass
Bence Bátor - drums
Zoltán Kőváry - guitars
Imre Poniklo – vocals and guitars

Technical
Amber Smith - producer
Imre Poniklo – composer
Robin Guthrie – mixer
Jácint Jiling - master

References

External links

 rePRINT at Kalinkaland's webpage
 rePRINT at Amber Smith's webpage

2005 singles
2004 songs